Ivan Dodig was the defending champion, but decided not to participate.

2nd seed Mikhail Kukushkin won the title, defeating Sergei Bubka 6–3, 6–4 in the final.

Seeds

Draw

Finals

Top half

Bottom half

References
 Main Draw
 Qualifying Draw

President's Cup - Singles
2011 Men's Singles